|}

The Prix La Force is a Group 3 flat horse race in France open to three-year-old thoroughbreds. It is run over a distance of 2,000 metres (about 1¼ miles) at Longchamp in April.

History
The event is named in memory of the Duc de La Force, Bertrand Nompar de Caumont (1840–1909), a member of the Société d'Encouragement. It was established in 1910, and was initially open to horses aged three or four. Its original distance was 2,200 metres. It was later opened to older horses.

The Prix La Force was restricted to three-year-olds in 1950. From this point it was contested over 2,000 metres. For brief spells thereafter it was run over 2,200 metres (1956–58), 2,000 metres (1959–60), 2,400 metres (1961–63) and 2,600 metres (1964–65). It reverted to 2,000 metres in 1966.

The race was staged at Chantilly in 1995 and Deauville in 1996. It was run over 2,400 metres at Longchamp from 1997 to 2000. It was subsequently contested over 2,000 metres at Chantilly (2001–02) and Saint-Cloud (2003–04).

The event returned to Longchamp in 2005. It was temporarily increased to 2,100 metres in 2011. It was closed to fillies from the 2017 running.

The Prix La Force can serve as a trial for the Prix du Jockey Club. The last horse to win both races was Saonois in 2012.

Records
Leading jockey since 1950 (7 wins):
 Freddy Head – Cadmus (1966), Mazarin (1969), Orante (1975), Fabulous Dancer (1979), Truculent (1984), Louis Le Grand (1985), Val des Bois (1989)

Leading trainer since 1950 (8 wins):
 André Fabre – Al Nasr (1981), Sifting Gold (1990), Radevore (1996), Magellano (1997), Simon de Montfort (2010), Triple Threat (2013). Cloth Of Stars (2016), Graphite (2017)

Leading owner since 1950 (4 wins):
 Jacques Wertheimer – Orante (1975), Truculent (1984), Val des Bois (1989), Kotashaan (1991)

Winners since 1978

Earlier winners

 1910: Oversight
 1911: Matchless
 1912: Basse Pointe
 1913: Amadou
 1914: Ecouen
 1919: Le Dragon
 1920: Cid Campeador
 1921: Sourbier
 1922: Zagreus
 1923: Saint Hubert
 1924: Premontre
 1925: Cadum
 1926: Ptolemy
 1927: Javelot
 1928: Rialto
 1929: Bubbles
 1931: Roi de Trefle
 1932: Filarete
 1936: Quai d'Orsay
 1937: Gonfalonier
 1941: Manjano
 1942: Pampre d'Or
 1943: Escamillo
 1950: Alizier
 1951:
 1952: Aram
 1953: Semillant
 1954: Malatesta
 1955:
 1956: Fastfol
 1957: Flush Royal II
 1958: Currito
 1959: Colisee / Simono *
 1960: Puissant Chef
 1961: Okay II
 1962:
 1963:
 1964: Silfric
 1965: Principino
 1966: Cadmus
 1967: Topyo
 1968: Abgal
 1969: Mazarin
 1970: Sassafras
 1971: 
 1972: Sanur
 1973: Verkade
 1974: Un Kopeck
 1975: Orante
 1976: Malacate
 1977: Olantengy

* The 1959 race was a dead-heat and has joint winners.

See also
 List of French flat horse races

References

 France Galop / Racing Post:
 france-galop.com – A Brief History: Prix La Force.
 galop.courses-france.com – Prix La Force – Palmarès depuis 1980.
 galopp-sieger.de – Prix La Force.
 horseracingintfed.com – International Federation of Horseracing Authorities – Prix La Force (2019).
 pedigreequery.com – Prix La Force – Longchamp.

Flat horse races for three-year-olds
Longchamp Racecourse
Horse races in France
1910 establishments in France
Recurring sporting events established in 1910